James Larcombe (1884–1957) was a Labor politician from Queensland, Australia. He was a Member of the Queensland Legislative Assembly.

Early life
James Larcombe was born in Rockhampton, Queensland on 25 April 1884.  His father, also named James Larcombe, was a butcher, and his mother was Mary (née Lee). He was educated at the Jenkins private school in Rockhampton. As a young man, he worked as a butcher with his father and was active in the local labor movement.

Politics
At the 1912 election, he was elected to the Legislative Assembly of Queensland to represent the newly created electoral district of Keppel. While the MLA for Keppel, he was a minister without portfolio from 9 September 1919 to 22 October 1919. Then he was appointed as Secretary for Public Works from 22 October 1919 to 7 April 1920. Then he was Secretary for Railways (7 April 1920 to 21 May 1929). At the 1929 election, he was defeated by Daniel Owen of the Country and Progressive National Party.

He was elected again to the legislative assembly in the electoral district of Rockhampton at the 1932 election. Again he served in a number of ministries: 
 Secretary for Mines:  12 April 1939 to 4 August 1939
 Minister for Transport: 4 August 1939 to 27 April 1944
 Secretary for Public Instruction: 27 April 1944 to 7 March 1946
 Treasurer: 7 March 1946 to 10 May 1950
 Attorney-General: 10 May 1950 to 10 March 1952
He held the seat of Rockhampton until his retirement at the 1956 election.

Combining his service in Keppel and Rockhampton makes him the assembly's longest serving member with 40 years 11 months 22 days; however, Joh Bjelke-Petersen has the longest period of continuous service (40 years 6 months 28 days).

Later life
Having never married, Larcombe died in Brisbane on 21 June 1957. He was accorded a State funeral 
which took place from St Paul's Cathedral, Rockhampton to the South Rockhampton Cemetery.

References

1884 births
1957 deaths
People from Rockhampton
Members of the Queensland Legislative Assembly
Treasurers of Queensland
Attorneys-General of Queensland
Australian Labor Party members of the Parliament of Queensland
20th-century Australian politicians